False Start (German: Falscher Start) is a 1919 German silent film directed by Georg Alexander and starring Alexander, Marija Leiko and Kissa von Sievers.

Cast
 Georg Alexander as George Broosten 
 Marija Leiko as Inge 
 Kissa von Sievers as Varietékünstlerin Daisy

References

Bibliography
 Bock, Hans-Michael & Bergfelder, Tim. The Concise CineGraph. Encyclopedia of German Cinema. Berghahn Books, 2009.

External links

1919 films
Films of the Weimar Republic
German silent feature films
Films directed by Georg Alexander
German black-and-white films